Surviliškis is a village in Kėdainiai district municipality, in Kaunas County, in central Lithuania. According to the 2011 census, the village has a population of 8 people. It is located next to the southern edge of Surviliškis town, by the regional road  Kėdainiai-Krekenava-Panevėžys, on the right bank of the Nevėžis river. There is a farm cooperative.

Demography

References

Villages in Kaunas County
Kėdainiai District Municipality